"Last Day" is a limited release single by the indie rock band Editors. It was released on vinyl as part of Record Store Day on Saturday 17 April 2010, and is limited to 1000 copies.

A video was released to coincide with the Record Store Day on 17 April 2010. The video primarily features the band rehearsals from the March/April shows and also shows some concert footage.

The b-side is an acoustic version of the song "Papillon" played live at Studio Brussel.

Track listing
 "Last Day" - 3:13
 "Papillon (acoustic)" - 3:04

Charts

References

Editors (band) songs
2010 singles
Record Store Day releases
Song recordings produced by Flood (producer)
2009 songs
PIAS Recordings singles
Songs written by Chris Urbanowicz
Songs written by Edward Lay
Songs written by Russell Leetch
Songs written by Tom Smith (musician)